Alessandra Giuseppina Grassi Herrera (born 29 August 1976) is a Mexican professional road cyclist. She won a silver medal in the women's time trial at the 2007 Pan American Games in Rio de Janeiro, Brazil, and later represented her nation Mexico at the 2008 Summer Olympics.

Grassi qualified for the Mexican squad, as a lone female cyclist, in the women's road race at the 2008 Summer Olympics in Beijing by receiving a single berth from the UCI World Cup. She successfully completed a grueling race with a forty-fifth-place effort in 3:36:35, recording the same time with, but finishing behind Belgium's Lieselot Decroix by an inch.

Career highlights

2007
 2nd Pan American Games, Rio de Janeiro (BRA)
 2nd Pan American Championships (ITT)
2008
 1st Mexican Championships (Road), Sonora (MEX)
 1st Mexican Championships (ITT), Sonora (MEX)
 2nd Pan American Championships (ITT)
 45th Olympic Games, Beijing (CHN)
2009
 1st Pan American Championships (ITT)
 5th Pan American Championships (Road)
 8th Stage 3, Route de France Féminine, France
2010
 6th Pan American Championships (ITT)
 10th Pan American Championships (Road)
2011
 2nd Mexican Championships (ITT)
2012
 2nd Mexican Championships (Road)

References

External links
NBC Olympics Profile

1976 births
Living people
Mexican female cyclists
Cyclists at the 2008 Summer Olympics
Cyclists at the 2007 Pan American Games
Olympic cyclists of Mexico
Sportspeople from Mexico City
Pan American Games silver medalists for Mexico
Pan American Games medalists in cycling
Medalists at the 2007 Pan American Games
20th-century Mexican women
21st-century Mexican women
Competitors at the 2006 Central American and Caribbean Games